Sangar may refer to:

Places

Iran
Sangar, Darab, Fars Province
Sangar, Sepidan, Fars Province
Sang Kar, Fars, also known as Sangar
Sar Gar, Fars, also known as Sangar
Sangar, Iran, Sangar District, Rasht County, Gilan Province
Sangar District
Sangar Rural District (Gilan Province)
Sangar-e Chanibeh-ye Do, also known as Sangar, Khuzestan Province
Sangar, Lorestan
Sangar, Markazi
Sangar, Amol, Mazandaran Province
Sangar, Neka, Mazandaran Province
Sangar Rural District (North Khorasan Province)
Sangar, Razavi Khorasan
Sangar, Maku, a village in West Azerbaijan Province
Sangar, Oshnavieh, a village in West Azerbaijan Province

Elsewhere
Sangar, Afghanistan
Sangar, New South Wales, Australia
Sangar, Sakha Republic, Russia
Sangar railway station, Jammu district, Jammu and Kashmir, India
Tsugaru Strait, or Strait of Sangar, in Japan

Other uses
Sangar (crater), on Mars
Sangar (fortification), a temporary fortified position
Sangar (name)

See also